The Hollywood Post Alliance Award for Outstanding Color Grading for Television is an annual award, given by the Hollywood Post Alliance, or HPA, to post production workers in the film and television industry, in this case color graders. It was first awarded in 2006, and has been presented every year since.

Winners and nominees

2000s

2010s

Programs with multiple awards

2 awards
 The Crown (Netflix)
 Game of Thrones (HBO)
|}

Programs with multiple nominations

7 nominations
 Game of Thrones (HBO)

3 nominations
 Castle (ABC)
 CSI: Crime Scene Investigation (CBS)
 Mad Men (AMC)
 Outside the Lines (ESPN)

2 nominations
 Boardwalk Empire (HBO)
 The Crown (Netflix)
 Gotham (Fox)
 The Marveous Mrs. Maisel (Amazon)
 Outlander (Starz)

See also

 List of American television awards

References

American television awards